Andrew John Perchlik (born June 3, 1968) is an American activist and politician from Vermont. A Democrat, in 2018 he was elected to the Vermont Senate from the three-member at-large Washington County Senate District.

Early life and education
Perchlik was born in Greeley, Colorado on June 3, 1968, a son of Richard Perchlik and Sylvia (Marston) Perchlik. His father was a professor of political science at Colorado State College (now the University of Northern Colorado). He also served as mayor of Greeley and owned and operated the Sharktooth Ski Area. Andrew Perchlik and his three siblings were raised in Greeley.

Perchlik attended an on-campus laboratory school at the University of Northern Colorado from Kindergarten through 12th grade. He then attended the university, from which he received a Bachelor of Science degree in environmental politics.

Career
Perchlik joined the Peace Corps after college and served in Panama. He became a resident of Vermont in 1991 as a VISTA volunteer, and worked on home weatherization and fuel assistance projects in Addison County. He subsequently returned to Colorado, and in 1995 he moved back to Vermont, which became his permanent residence. His family resided in Hubbardton and Randolph Center before moving to Marshfield in 1998. In 2017, they moved from Marshfield to Montpelier.

A recognized expert in the field of sustainable energy, Perchlik was the director of Vermont's Clean Energy Development Fund, founding executive director of Renewable Energy Vermont, a member of the Solar Rating Certification Corporation board of directors, and member of the International Code Council's Renewable Energy Advisory Council.

Vermont Senate
In 2018, incumbent Francis K. Brooks announced that he would not to run for reelection to the Vermont Senate. Perchlik was one of several candidates for the three Democratic nominations in the at-large Washington County Senate District. In the August primary, Perchlik and incumbents Ann Cummings and Anthony Pollina were nominated. Perchlik and Pollina were also nominated by the Vermont Progressive Party. In the November general election, Cummings, Pollina, and Perchlik were the top three finishers, defeating Republicans Ken Alger, Dwayne Tucker, and Chris S. Bradley, and independent Barry Wadle.

In his first term, Perchlik was appointed to the Senate's Education and Transportation committees. In addition, he served on the Barre Granite and Ethnic Culture Museum Steering Committee, the Committee to Oversee Planning and Design of the Vermont State House, and the New England Board of Higher Education Canvassing Committee.

In 2020, Perchlik was a candidate for reelection. In the November general election, Perchlik, Cummings, and Pollina were elected over Republicans Dwayne Tucker, Dawnmarie Tomasi, and Ken Alger.

Personal life
In 1997, Perchlik married Marianne Donahue. They have three children. Perchlik's uncle, John Prchlik, was a professional football player for the Detroit Lions from 1949 to 1953 and a labor relations executive at Ford Motor Company.

References

Sources

Internet

Newspapers

1968 births
Living people
21st-century American politicians
University of Northern Colorado alumni
People from Greeley, Colorado
People from Marshfield, Vermont
People from Montpelier, Vermont
Democratic Party Vermont state senators